Transport in Poland involves air, water, road and rail transportation. The country has a large network of municipal public transport, such as buses, trams and the metro. As a country located at the 'cross-roads' of Europe, Poland, with its highly developed economy, is a nation with a large and increasingly modern network of transport infrastructure.

The country's most important waterway is the Vistula river. The largest seaports are the Port of Gdańsk, the Port of Gdynia and the Port of Szczecin. Air travel is generally used for international travel, with many flights originating at Warsaw Chopin Airport. Railways connect all of Poland's major cities and the state-owned Polish State Railways (PKP) corporation, through its subsidiaries, runs a great number of domestic and international services of varying speed and comfort. In addition to this, five out of sixteen Polish voivodeships have their own regional rail service providers.

Rail transport 

Poland is served by an extensive network of railways. In most cities the main railway station is located near a city centre and is well connected to the local transportation system. The infrastructure is operated by PKP Group. The rail network is very dense in western and northern Poland, while eastern part of the country is less developed. The capital city, Warsaw, has the country's only rapid transit system: the Warsaw Metro.

The only high-speed rail line (though by most definitions, real high-speed rail only includes speeds over 200 km/h) in central-eastern Europe is the Central Rail Line (Poland), Centralna Magistrala Kolejowa (CMK).

Other high-speed lines:

In December 2014 new Alstom Pendolino ED250 high-speed trains were put into service between Gdańsk, Warsaw, Katowice and Kraków reducing the rail travel time from Gdańsk to Warsaw to 2 hours 58 minutes, to be reduced in late 2015 to 2 hours 37 minutes.
 Warsaw–Kutno–Poznań–(Berlin) (160 km/h)
 Warsaw–Siedlce–Terespol–(Minsk) (160, 120 km/h) – being upgraded to 160 km/h
 Warsaw–Puławy–Lublin (120, 140 km/h)
 Opole–Wrocław (160 km/h) and further upgraded via Legnica to Berlin and Hamburg

Projects
The Warsaw–Łódź line is being upgraded to allow speed up to 160 km/h (in order to bind together the Warsaw–Łódź agglomeration).

Plans were made to construct a new high-speed line (350 km/h) from Warsaw to Poznań and Wrocław with forks in Łódź and Kalisz., but the project was cancelled in November 2011 due to its high cost.

The PKP Group is the fourth largest railway throughout Europe. Trains are run by its different subsidiaries.

Passenger transport operators 
The following companies operate in Poland:
PKP Intercity – qualified passengers trains (express, intercity, eurocity, hotel and TLK)
Przewozy Regionalne – regional passengers trains (normal and fast train)
Koleje Śląskie - regional trains in Silesian Voivodeship
Koleje Mazowieckie – local trains in Mazovia centered on Warsaw
Szybka Kolej Miejska (Tricity) – fast urban railway serving the Tricity area of Gdańsk, Gdynia and Sopot
Szybka Kolej Miejska (Warsaw) –  suburban railway in Warsaw agglomeration
Warszawska Kolej Dojazdowa – suburban railway in Warsaw agglomeration
Arriva RP (owned by Deutsche Bahn) – part of the local train traffic in Kuyavian-Pomeranian Voivodeship
Koleje Dolnośląskie – part of the local train traffic in Lower Silesian Voivodeship
Koleje Wielkopolskie – part of the local train traffic in Greater Poland Voivodeship
Łódzka Kolej Aglomeracyjna - commuter railway operator in Łódź Voivodeship

Narrow-gauge railways 

These railways are mostly in decline, some survive as a museum or tourist railways.

Freight transport market 
PKP Cargo
PKP LHS – Metallurgic broad-gauge line
PTK Holding SA – The railway transportation holding in Zabrze
Przedsiębiorstwo Transportu Kolejowego i Gospodarki Kamieniem Rybnik – The Railway Transport and Stone Management Company in Rybnik
CTL Logistics
PCC Rail Szczakowa – Rail Szczakowa website – part of the German concern PCC AG
Kopalnia Piasku Kotlarnia – The Kotlarnia sand mine
Kopalnia Piasku Kuźnica Warężyńska – The Kuźnica Warężyńska sand mine
Orlen KolTrans
Lotos Kolej
Nadwiślanski Zakład Transportu Kolejowego- Vistula Rail Transport Company]

Broad-gauge railways 

Except for Linia Hutnicza Szerokotorowa, and a few very short stretches near border crossings, Poland uses the standard gauge for its railways. Therefore, Linia Hutnicza Szerokotorowa (known by its acronym LHS, English: Broad-gauge steelworks line) in Sławków is the longest broad-gauge railway line in Poland. The line runs on a single track for almost  from the Polish-Ukrainian border, crossing it just east of Hrubieszów. It is the westernmost broad-gauge railway line in Europe that is connected to the broad-gauge rail system of the countries of the former Soviet Union.

Rail system 
Total: 
standard gauge  :  ( electrified;  double track)
broad gauge  : 

As of December 2002 narrow-gauge railways were no longer owned or operated by PKP. They were transferred to regional authorities or became independent companies.

Rail links with adjacent countries 
 Same gauge:
 Czech Republic
 Germany
 Slovakia
 Break-of-gauge – /
 Lithuania
 Belarus
 Russia (Kaliningrad Oblast)
 Ukraine

Road transport 

Polish public roads are grouped into categories related to administrative division.
National roads (Technical classes A, S, GP and exceptionally G): ,  unsurfaced
Voivodeship roads (Classes G, Z and exceptionally GP): ,  unsurfaced
Powiat roads (Classes G, Z and exceptionally L): ,  unsurfaced
Gmina roads (Classes L, D and exceptionally Z): ,  unsurfaced

In recent years, the network has been improving and government spending on road construction recently saw a huge increase, due to rapid development of the country and the inflow of European Union funds for infrastructure projects.

Motorways and expressways 

Polish motorways and expressways are part of national roads network.

 Motorways in Poland,  (2021):
A1  |  A2  |  A4  |  A6  |  A8  |  A18

 Expressways in Poland,  (2021):S1 | S2 | S3 | S5 |
S6 | S7 | S8 | S10 |
S11 | S12 | S14 | S16 | 
S17 | S19 | S22 |
S51 | S52 | S61 | S74 | S79 | S86

Air transport 

The most important airport in Poland is Warsaw 'Frederic Chopin' International Airport. Warsaw's airport is the main international hub for LOT Polish Airlines.

In addition to Warsaw Chopin, Wrocław, Gdańsk, Katowice, Kraków and Poznań all have international airports.

In preparation for the Euro 2012 football championships jointly hosted by Poland and Ukraine, a number of airports around the country were renovated and redeveloped. This included the building of new terminals with an increased number of jetways and stands at both Copernicus Airport in Wrocław and Lech Wałęsa Airport in Gdańsk.

Airports
The Polish airline market was until 2004 a closed market, with bilateral agreements between countries served from the national hub – Warsaw. The regional airports were mostly serving as spokes, and were controlled by PPL, the state-owned airport authority. However, in the 1990s it was decided to deregulate the airport market and abolish the dominant position of PPL. Nearly all local airports (apart from Zielona Góra airport) became separate companies, with local governments involved in their management, which led to the partial decentralisation. Soon after opening of Polish sky for competition, flights "avoiding" the Warsaw hub became more common.

There are twelve passenger airports in operation, and there is also an airport Heringsdorf in German village Garz, 7 kilometers from Polish seaside spa Świnoujście.

International airports
List of airports in Poland
The following are the largest airports in Poland (In descending order for 2013):
 Warsaw Frederic Chopin International Airport
 Kraków John Paul II International Airport
 Gdańsk Lech Wałęsa International Airport
 Katowice International Airport
 Wrocław Mikołaj Kopernik International Airport
 Poznań International Airport
 Rzeszów-Jasionka Airport
 Łódź Władysław Reymont Airport
 Szczecin-Goleniów "Solidarność" Airport
 Warsaw Modlin
Bydgoszcz Ignacy Jan Paderewski Airport 
 Lublin Airport
 Radom Airport
 Olsztyn-Mazury Regional Airport

Domestic:
 Zielona Góra-Babimost Airport

Airports with paved runways:
Total: 84 (2005)
 over 3,047 m: 4
 2,438 to 3,047 m: 29
 1,524 to 2,437 m: 41
 914 to 1,523 m: 7
 under 914 m: 3

Airports – with unpaved runways:
Total: 39 (2005)
 2,438 to 3,047 m: 1
 1,524 to 2,437 m: 4
 914 to 1,523 m: 13
 under 914 m: 21

Heliports: 2 (2005)

Water transport 

The country's most important waterway is the river Vistula. The largest seaports are the Port of Szczecin and Port of Gdańsk.

Marine transport in Poland has two main sub-groups, riverine and seaborne. On the Baltic Sea coast, a number of large seaports exist to serve the international freight and passenger trade; these are typically deep water ports and are able to serve very large ships, including the ro-ro ferries of Unity Line, Polferries and Stena Line which operate the Poland – Scandinavia passenger lines.

Riverine services operate on almost all major Polish rivers and canals (such as the Danube–Oder and Elbląg canals) as well as on domestic coastal routes.

Waterways 
Poland has  of navigable rivers and canals (as of 2009).

Ports and harbors 

 Port of Gdańsk  (Polferries: Gdańsk — Nynäshamn / Ystad)
 Port of Gdynia  (Stena Line: Gdynia — Karlskrona / Gothenburg and Finnlines: Gdynia — Helsinki / Rostock)
 Port of Szczecin-Świnoujście  (Polferries: Świnoujście — Copenhagen / Ystad / Rønne and Unity Line: Świnoujście — Ystad / Trelleborg)
 Port of Police
 Port of Kołobrzeg
 Port of Ustka

Merchant marine 

Total: 57 ships (1,000 GT or over) totaling 1,120,165 GT/

Ships by type:
bulk 50, cargo 2, chemical tanker 2, roll-on/roll-off 1, short-sea passenger 2
(1999 est.)

Municipal transport

Bus 

Most Polish towns and cities have well developed municipal bus services. Typically, a city possesses its own local bus service, however, in some cases they have private competitors operating on certain lines upon the agreement with local authorities.

Until the 1990s, interurban connections were operated by a single, state-owned company PKS. Since then, it has been broken into a number of independent national and municipal enterprises. In addition, several private operators emerged. There are two classes of service distinguished by vehicle length:
 autobus — longer vehicles (12.0 m and more),
 bus — shorter vehicles with smaller capacity, very popular on local connections, run by individual persons and smaller companies.
While they often use the same bus stops, they tend to use different stations.

Tram 

Bigger cities run dense tram networks, which are the primary mean of public transport. A new network has been constructed in Olsztyn in 2015. See the list of town tramway systems in Poland

Since the 1990s, a number of cities attempts to upgrade certain parts of their networks to the light rail standard (called szybkie tramwaje, En. fast trams). The most notable investments are Poznań Fast Tram and Kraków Fast Tram with the underground  premetro section.

Trolleybus 

Trolleybuses can be found in three cities: Gdynia (with some lines reaching Sopot), Lublin and Tychy.

Rapid transit 

The first metro line was opened in Warsaw in 1995. Part of the second line was opened in 2015. This is part of the country's rail transport infrastructure. There are no official plans to build metro in other cities due to the lack of funds, but there is an ongoing debate whether they should be built, especially in Kraków.

Pipelines 
 Crude oil and petroleum products 
 Natural gas 
(2006 est.)

See also 
 Automotive industry in Poland
 List of bridges in Poland
 Plug-in electric vehicles in Poland
 Ports of the Baltic Sea

References

External links 
 ,  Online rail timetables,  Online rail and bus timetable
 Rail Map: Poland (PDF) Most minor lines omitted
 Road Map: Poland